James Gunnar Nixon (born January 13, 1993) is an American track and field athlete who competes in the decathlon. He broke the  American high school record for the event in 2011, and was the World Junior Champion in 2012. He won his first national title indoors in 2013, and was runner-up at the 2013 USA Outdoor Track and Field Championships. His personal record for the decathlon is 8313 points at the 2013 IAAF World Championships.

Career
Born in Weatherford, Oklahoma, he was the fourth child of Tim and Kerri Nixon. He was raised in Tulsa until he moved to Edmond as a high school sophomore. He attended Edmond Santa Fe High School, where he started taking part in decathlon competitions and broke the national high school record with a score of 8035 points (which brought him the Gatorade Track and Field Athlete of the Year Award in the men's section). He won at the Arcadia Invitational high school competition with a meet record of 7573 points (with junior implements). He entered the individual high jump at the 2012 Summer Youth Olympics and placed sixth in his final. At the 2011 Pan American Junior Athletics Championships he took the silver medal in the decathlon behind American team mate Kevin Lazas.

He won an athletic scholarship to study at the University of Arkansas. In his first season for the Arkansas Razorbacks he broke the world junior record for the indoor heptathlon with a score of 6022 points. He followed this with a runner-up finish at the Southeastern Conference indoor championships, then gained his first All-American honours with an eighth-place finish at the NCAA Indoor Championship. In the outdoor season he came third at the SEC Outdoor Championship meet then came fifth with an American junior record of 7892 points at the NCAA Outdoor Championship. He won both the American junior title, and the gold medal at the 2012 World Junior Championships in Athletics.

Nixon started the 2013 indoor season with a heptathlon personal record of 6232 points to win at the USA Indoor Track and Field Championships – his first national title. At the Hypo-Meeting in Europe in May he broke 8000 points for the first time in a decathlon with senior implements, taking third place with a score of 8136 points. Forgoing collegiate competition that year, he focused on the 2013 USA Outdoor Track and Field Championships. There he led for the first day but fell behind Ashton Eaton in the second day to close the decathlon with a personal record of 8198 points for second place. This earned him selection for the 2013 World Championships in Athletics.

Fall 2013
Joined Coach Jeremy Fischer and Craig Poole at USA Olympic Training Center in Chula Vista, CA. Coach Art Venegas will assist in the throws.

Personal records
100 meters – 10.80 sec (2013)
400 meters – 48.37 sec (2011)
1500 meters – 4:22.36 min (2012)
110-meter hurdles – 14.13 sec (2014)
High jump – 2.17 m (2012)
Pole vault – 4.66 m (2013)
Long jump – 7.80 m (2013)
Shot put – 14.68 m (2013)
Discus throw – 42.38 m (2013)
Javelin throw – 60.44 m (2013)
Decathlon – 8313 pts (2013)

References

External links
 
 
 

1993 births
Living people
American male decathletes
Sportspeople from Edmond, Oklahoma
Athletes (track and field) at the 2010 Summer Youth Olympics
World Athletics Championships athletes for the United States
Arkansas Razorbacks men's track and field athletes
USA Indoor Track and Field Championships winners